Anbil Dharmalingam Agricultural College and Research Institute is an agricultural college at Navalur Kuttappattu village near Tiruchirappalli. It is part of the Tamil Nadu Agricultural University. It offers undergraduate degree in agriculture.

It is named after a former DMK politician Anbil Dharmalingam.

Departments
The Departments in university college.

Department of agronomy
Department of soil science and agricultural chemistry
Department of plant breeding and genetics
Department of plant Protection
Department of Social Science

Research centre
Kumaraperumal Farm Science Centre - Soil Salinity Research Centre

Location
It is located on Tiruchirapalli Dindigul Highway Road at Navalur Kuttappattu near Tiruchirappalli.

References

External links
 

Agricultural universities and colleges in Tamil Nadu
Universities and colleges in Tiruchirappalli
Educational institutions established in 1989
1989 establishments in Tamil Nadu

ta:தமிழ்நாடு வேளாண்மைப் பல்கலைக்கழகம்